Theodore Bayley Hardy,  (20 October 1863 – 18 October 1918) was a British Army chaplain and a recipient of the Victoria Cross, the highest award for gallantry in the face of the enemy that can be awarded to British and Commonwealth forces. In addition to the VC, Hardy had been awarded the Distinguished Service Order and Military Cross, making him one of the most decorated non-combatants of the First World War.

Early life
Hardy was born 20 October 1863 to George and Sarah Richards Hardy of Exeter. Hardy was educated at the Royal Commercial Travellers School, Pinner, Middlesex from 1872 to 1879, City of London School from 1879 to 1882 and at the University of London. He was ordained in 1898. He was an Assistant Master at Nottingham High School from 1891 to 1907, teaching D. H. Lawrence; a Junior School house there is named in his honour. From 1907 to 1913, Hardy was headmaster of Bentham Grammar School in West Yorkshire. He was married to Florence Elizabeth Hastings, with whom he had a son and daughter. Mrs Hardy died after a year of illness in 1914.

Theodore Hardy was teetotal and a vegetarian.

First World War

Hardy was aged 51 when war broke out, and was priest at Hutton Roof in the Lake District. He volunteered at once but was turned down as being too old. Eventually, in August 1916, he was accepted for army service as a Temporary Chaplain to the Forces, 4th Class and attached to 8th Battalion, The Lincolnshire Regiment. He carried out the following deeds for which he was awarded a series of decorations. First he was awarded the Distinguished Service Order (DSO) on 18 October 1917, the full citation was published on 7 March 1918:

This was followed by the Military Cross (MC) on 17 December 1917, the citation following on 23 April 1918:

Finally came the VC on 7 July 1918:

Hardy was appointed to the honorary position of Chaplain to His Majesty on 17 September 1918.

Death

He was wounded in action when again trying to tend to the wounded and died a week later in Rouen, France, on 18 October 1918, two days before his 55th birthday.

He was buried at St. Sever Cemetery Extension, Rouen, France, in block S, plot V, row J, grave 1. There are memorials to Hardy at Carlisle Cathedral, at the former Royal Commercial Travellers School, Pinner, Middlesex (now the Harrow Arts Centre), City of London School and in his old church at Hutton Roof in Cumbria.

His medals are displayed at The Museum of Army Chaplaincy in Amport, Hampshire.

References
Footnotes

Bibliography
 
 

1863 births
1918 deaths
Alumni of the University of London
British Army personnel of World War I
British military personnel killed in World War I
British World War I recipients of the Victoria Cross
Companions of the Distinguished Service Order
People educated at the City of London School
Clergy from Exeter
Recipients of the Military Cross
Royal Army Chaplains' Department officers
World War I chaplains
English military chaplains
People educated at Nottingham High School
British Army recipients of the Victoria Cross
Military personnel from Exeter